Estefanía Bottini Alemany (born 3 February 1974), known as Estefanía Bottini, is a former professional tennis player from Spain.

Biography
Bottini played on the professional tour in the 1990s, reaching a best singles ranking of 159 in the world.

Her best performances on the WTA Tour came in her home city of Barcelona, making the second round once, in 1991, then in 1992 taking world number 13 Nathalie Tauziat to three sets.

At the 1995 US Open she and Gala León García made the women's doubles main draw as lucky losers from qualifying and reached the second round.

ITF finals

Singles (0–4)

Doubles (3–4)

Notes

References

External links
 
 

1974 births
Living people
Spanish female tennis players
Tennis players from Barcelona